Salur is a town in Vizianagaram district, Andhra Pradesh, India

Salur may also refer to:
Salur tribe, ancient Oghuz Turkic people

Places
Salur, Gerede, village in Bolu province, Turkey
Salur, Elmalı, village in Antalya province, Turkey
Salur mandal, a mandal in Vizianagaram district, Andhra Pradesh, India
Salur (ST) (Assembly constituency) in Andhra Pradesh, India
Salur, Çorum
Salur, Orta
Salur, Refahiye

People with the name
Selma Salur, American mathematician
Saman Salur (born 1976), Iranian film director